Alfred Ngaro (born 1966) is a New Zealand politician. He was a member of the New Zealand House of Representatives from 2011 to 2020. He is a member of the National Party and the first Cook Islander who was elected to Parliament in New Zealand.

Early life
Ngaro was raised in Te Atatū and attended the local schools of Edmonton Primary, Rangeview Intermediate and Henderson High School. Both his parents came from the Cook Islands. Ngaro's father Daniel Ngaro from Aitutaki and Pukapuka was a union delegate, and the family has a long tradition of voting for the Labour Party. His mother, Toko Kirianu, is from Mangaia. His parents worked hard, his Mum a cleaner and Dad a labourer, to give Ngaro and his siblings schooling and training opportunities.

He trained and qualified as an electrician out west and also completed his theological degree at the Henderson campus of the Bible College of New Zealand (now Laidlaw College). Prior to entering Parliament, Ngaro was a consultant in community led development and governance with expertise in New Zealand, Cook Islands and Canada. He co-pioneered several community initiatives such as the Tamaki Achievement Pathway, Healthy Village Action Zone (HVAZ) Project, and the Inspiring Communities Exchange Network sponsored by the Tindall Foundation. Ngaro's governance experience includes key roles on the National Family Violence Taskforce, Auckland District Health Board and Pacific Advisory Committee Auckland City Council. He is also an Ambassador for the White Ribbon campaign. He later won a Sir Peter Blake Emerging Leader Award for his work on the Tamaki Transformation Project.

Ngaro served as the Auckland District Health Board's Pacific committee chairman and as the Tamaki College board of trustees chairman. He is a member of various advisory committees for the Ministry of Social Development.

Member of Parliament

Ngaro was encouraged by his friend Sam Lotu-Iiga to become active in politics. Ngaro was a candidate for Citizens & Ratepayers in the Maungakiekie-Tamaki ward at the 2010 elections for the Auckland Council. He finished second to Richard Northey and was not elected.

Fifth National Government, 2011–2017
In early September 2011, he was announced as a list-only candidate for the New Zealand National Party at the 2011 election. He was ranked at 37 on the party list and was subsequently elected. He is the first Cook Islander to be elected to the New Zealand Parliament, sitting in the 50th Parliament.

Ngaro voted against the End of Life Choice Bill and the Marriage (Definition of Marriage) Amendment Bill.

In the 2014 general election Ngaro was the National Party candidate for Te Atatū. He lost to Labour's Phil Twyford by 2,813 votes. Ranked 34th on the National Party list, Ngaro returned to parliament as a National List MP. He was instrumental in getting Cook Islands World War One soldiers formally recognised by the New Zealand government for their role during the Great War.

On 20 December 2016, he was sworn in as a Minister in the Fifth National Government of New Zealand, after being promoted to Cabinet by Prime Minister Bill English. He served as the Minister for Pacific Peoples, Minister for the Community and Voluntary Sector, Associate Minister for Children, and Associate Minister for Social Housing. In May 2017, he told a National Party conference that he could cut government funding to organisations associated with Labour candidate Willie Jackson if Jackson spoke out against the government during the election campaign. He apologised after his words were criticised by both Labour leader Andrew Little and Minister of Finance Steven Joyce. Prime Minister Bill English subsequently offered reassurances to community agencies that they would always be free to express views on government policy, and announced that he had asked officials to review the decisions Ngaro had made as a minister. Ngaro did not offer his resignation.

Coalition Government, 2017–2020
Following the 2017 general election, Ngaro became National's Spokesperson for Children, Community and Voluntary Sector, and Pacific Peoples. In mid-May 2019, there were reports that Ngaro was considering forming his own Christian party, providing a potential coalition partner for National at the 2020 general election. National Party leader Simon Bridges initially downplayed these reports but later stated that he was giving Ngaro the "space" to explore setting up a Christian values party. In late May 2019, Ngaro ruled out starting a new Christian party and confirmed that he would remain a member of the National Party.

During the 2020 general election, Ngaro attracted media attention on 10 October after he posted a Facebook attack ad claiming that a vote for his Labour opponent Phil Twyford would lead to the decriminalisation of recreational cannabis and all drugs and unlimited abortion. Though Ngaro subsequently deleted his post, Twyford captured a screenshot and accused his opponent of spreading fake news. Ngaro's post was also criticised by Labour MP Ruth Dyson, Auckland Councilor Richard Hills, political commentator Ben Thomas, and former Internet Party Laila Harré. In addition, National Party leader Judith Collins issued a media statement that Ngaro's comments were not shared by the rest of the party.

During the 2020 general election, Ngaro contested Te Atatū, losing it to the incumbent Twyford by a final margin of 10,508 votes. Since he did not rank highly enough on National's party list, he also lost his seat. Ngaro departed Parliament on 21 October after delivering a dawn prayer and a rendition of the national anthem God Defend New Zealand on the steps of Parliament.

Views
Ngaro is a Christian and a self-described Christian Zionist. Ngaro holds a theology degree and served as a community pastor. In mid-May 2019, Ngaro attracted criticism from former National MP Jami-Lee Ross and the Abortion Law Reform Association of New Zealand when he shared a Facebook post on his page likening abortion to the Holocaust. Ngaro later apologised and issued a statement saying "he did not read the full Facebook post before sharing and said the word "tragedy" should have been used instead of "holocaust". In response, National Party leader Simon Bridges defended Ngaro's right to voice his opinion while stating that it was not something he would say.

Personal life
Ngaro is of Cook Island descent. Ngaro's grandmother's father was of Polish Jewish descent. His wife Mokauina is of Samoan-Niuean descent. They have four children: three boys and one girl.

Controversy
In 2009, Alfred Ngaro allegedly punched former Tamaki College art teacher Christopher Scott Roy for not bowing his head during a prayer, but the allegations were later dismissed in Court by Chief Judge Graeme Colgan who wrote in a report: "I am sceptical about the veracity of Mr Roy's accounts of relevant and crucial events in this case. He is not a consistently reliable witness of truth". Tamaki College denied any assault occurred. In a judgment released mid November 2013, ERA member Tania Tetitaha found there were several issues with Roy's statements about the alleged accusations. When Roy took the matter to police, they declined to investigate. The ERA also found a lack of evidence of bullying behaviour. The police and Employment Relations Authority did not investigate the incident.

References

1960s births
New Zealand people of Cook Island descent
New Zealand people of Polish-Jewish descent
New Zealand National Party MPs
New Zealand list MPs
Electricians
Christian Zionists
New Zealand Protestant ministers and clergy
Members of the New Zealand House of Representatives
Living people
21st-century New Zealand politicians
Unsuccessful candidates in the 2020 New Zealand general election